The Questions is a studio album by American jazz singer Kurt Elling that was released by Okeh.

Track listing
 "A Hard Rain's a-Gonna Fall" (Bob Dylan, arrangement: Stu Mindeman, Kurt Elling) - 8:12
 "A Happy Thought" (Mindeman, Franz Wright) - 3:46
 "American Tune" (Paul Simon, arr.: Christian Elsässer, adaptation: Mindeman) - 6:12
 "Washing of the Water" (Peter Gabriel) - 4:12
 "A Secret in Three Views" (Jaco Pastorius, Elling, Phil Galdston, Rumi) - 6:18
 "Lonely Town" (Leonard Bernstein, Betty Comden, Adolph Green) - 6:54
 "Endless Lawns" (Carla Bley, Kurt Elling, Sara Teasdale) - 9:04
 "I Have Dreamed" (Rodgers & Hammerstein, arr.: John McLean, Elling) - 6:07
 "The Enchantress" (Joey Calderazzo, Kurt Elling, Wallace Stevens) - 6:24
 "Skylark" (Hoagy Carmichael, Johnny Mercer) - 8:12

Personnel

 Kurt Elling – vocals
 Marquis Hill – flugelhorn, trumpet
 Branford Marsalis – soprano saxophone
 Joey Calderazzo – piano 
 Stu Mindeman – piano, Hammond B3 organ
 John McLean – electric guitar, acoustic guitar
 Clark Sommers – double bass
 Jeff "Tain" Watts – drums

References

2018 albums
Kurt Elling albums
Okeh Records albums